Castlevania: The Arcade, released in Japan as , is an arcade game, part of the Castlevania franchise by Konami. The game was announced on July 23, 2008. The game was released in Japan on October 2, 2009. A European release was announced for 2009 but only appeared at test locations in 2008.

Gameplay
The gameplay is similar to light gun shooters such as The House of the Dead. Players utilize a special LED whip remote. The remote has two buttons. A top thumb button used to activate the whip, prompting players to swing the remote at the screen to damage enemies. A bottom button for the index finger is used to activate subweapons, such as knives or crosses. Subweapons are refilled by collecting hearts (up to 25) strewn about each stage in the form of destructible candles and wooden crates.

Up to two players can play the game at once. Characters in the game include the Vampire Hunter, the Lady Gunner, and the Little Witch.

Audio
Castlevania: The Arcades soundtrack was released on Akumajou Dracula Best Music Collections Box, an 18-CD box set containing music from many Castlevania titles. The Arcades music was featured on Disc 17.

References

External links
 Official website 

2009 video games
Arcade video games
Arcade-only video games
Cooperative video games
Multiplayer and single-player video games
Video games developed in Japan
Castlevania spin-off games